Scott Michael Disick (born May 26, 1983) is an American media personality and socialite. He is most famous for starring as a main cast member on Keeping Up with the Kardashians and its spinoffs. Disick's popularity on Keeping Up with the Kardashians led to the development of a house flipping show, Flip It Like Disick, that aired on E!. In addition to starring on reality shows, Disick has pursued multiple business ventures, including starting a clothing brand Talentless, investing in nightclubs, and running multiple vitamin companies.

Early life
Disick was born Eastport, New York to Jeffrey and Bonnie Disick. He is an only child. Disick's grandfather, David Disick, developed luxury properties, and Scott's father was also a real estate developer. He attended The Ross School in East Hampton, but did not graduate from the school. As a teenager, Disick was a book cover model for the Heartland series. Disick has always been interested in architecture, and he often read Dwell as a teen. He was raised Jewish. When he was 18 years old, he was arrested for driving while impaired and pled guilty to a noncriminal charge.

Career
In 2007, Disick began appearing on Keeping Up with the Kardashians alongside then-girlfriend Kourtney Kardashian. He has appeared on every season of the show. In the early seasons, he was well known for wearing suits.

In 2009, Disick is starred alongside Kourtney Kardashian and Kim Kardashian in Kourtney and Kim Take Miami, a spin-off of Keeping Up with the Kardashians. Disick received criticism due to a plot line in a March 2013 episode, in which Disick hunted an alligator so that he could make a pair of shoes. The series ended in 2013. Disick also starred on a 2011 episode of the short-lived CW series H8R, where he tried to convince a woman who had expressed her disgust of Disick on social media that he was likable.

From 2011 to 2012, Disick, Kourtney, and Kim starred in a second spin-off series, titled Kourtney and Kim Take New York. A second season plot line followed Disick as he developed a Japanese restaurant called Ryu in the Meatpacking District of New York City. Disick was involved in the design of the restaurant as well as the menu development, and he promoted the restaurant on several occasions, including an appearance at Macy's Fashion Night. The restaurant opened in 2012, and the opening was featured on an episode of Keeping Up with The Kardashians, but it received poor reviews and Disick backed out of the restaurant shortly after opening. The restaurant closed 191 days after opening.

On the episode of Keeping Up with the Kardashians in 2012, Disick purchased an online knighting ceremony on a trip to London and often refers to himself as "Lord". He had to buy a piece of land to get knighted. Disick was a judge on Miss Universe 2012 alongside Lisa Vanderpump, Brad Goreski, and Masaharu Morimoto. Disick was featured on a 2012 episode of Punk'd in which his car was towed and he had to barter to get it back.

In 2013, Disick had a web series called Lord Disick: Lifestyles of a Lord, which was a spin-off of Kourtney and Kim Take Miami. The series featured Disick showing off his car collection and wealthy lifestyle while providing viewers with tips on how to live lavishly.

From 2014 to 2015, Disick starred alongside Kourtney and Khloe Kardashian in Kourtney and Khloe Take The Hamptons. The series followed the Kardashian sisters as they opened a pop-up store in The Hamptons and attended events such as the Baby Buggy Summer Dinner. Disick struggled with anxiety throughout the series because he grew up in Eastport, a town next to Southampton, and being in the area reminded him of his parents who had recently died. While filming for Kourtney and Khloe Take The Hamptons, Disick and Khloe starred in an episode of Royal Pains, which takes place in The Hamptons, in which they played themselves.

Disick made several guest appearances on reality shows in 2015 and 2016. He appeared on an August 2015 episode of Kingin' with Tyga, had a recurring role on I Am Cait, appears on multiple episodes of Rob & Chyna, a 2016 episode of Wild 'n Out, and an episode of Kocktails with Khloe. He was considered as a possible contestant on Season 22 of Dancing with the Stars, but was turned down after he asked for $500,000.

Disick began developing properties in 2015. In 2019, Disick began starring on his own reality show, Flip It Like Disick, which follows his real estate and design business. The show follows Disick and his team, including Willa Ford, as they renovate luxury homes in the Greater Los Angeles area. Throughout the series, they remodel celebrity real estate in hour-long episodes.

Business ventures

Nightclub appearances
Disick has made club appearances at 1OAK nightclub in Las Vegas, Harrah's in Atlantic City, and LEX Nightclub in Reno, sometimes receiving $80,000 for a single appearance. Disick has also appeared in clubs internationally in Canada and the United Kingdom, earning $250,000 for his UK appearances. These appearances were often arranged by Disick's manager at the time, David Weintraub. Eventually, the club appearances began to interfere with Disick's addiction struggles, and he stopped making appearances. Disick has also invested in his friends' nightlife businesses.

Talentless
In 2018, Disick began his own clothing line, Talentless. He named his clothing line as "a big F-you to everybody in the world that basically said that anybody that was in the reality business 10, 15 years ago didn't have talent." He discussed the development of his company on season eight of Keeping Up with the Kardashians. Talentless sells primarily casual clothing such as T-shirts, sweatshirts, and sweatpants. Three percent of every sale from the company goes to the non-profit organization Fuck Cancer. The company received backlash in March 2020 and was accused of being insensitive after releasing apparel that stated "Please Wash Your Hands" amid the coronavirus pandemic. Colton Underwood, who starred on The Bachelor was seen wearing one of the "Wash Your Hands" sweatshirts.

Partnerships and other ventures
In 2010, when asked if he had a career, Disick stated "I make a lot of money, and I'm more than capable of supporting myself. I run multiple companies in the vitamin world — QuickTrim, Rejuvacare, Monte Carlo Perpetual Tan." 
In May 2011, Disick appeared on the cover of Men's Fitness.
A March 2015 episode of Keeping Up with the Kardashians revealed that Disick was the President of Calabasas Luxury Cars, which is owned by his best friend and Flip It Like Disick costar, Benny Luciano.

Disick was featured in a June 17, 2013 marketing short film by Kanye West's creative content company DONDA, in which Disick played Patrick Bateman from American Psycho. Disick is friends with rapper N.O.R.E., and is featured in a hip hop skit track on Student of the Game titled "Scot Disick Speaks" and misspelling Disick's first name. In 2015, Disick guest-starred as "Jim" on two episodes of the online soap opera Youthful Daze.

Disick often posts sponsored ads on Instagram, and once accidentally posted the sponsor's instructions in the caption. It has been estimated that he makes around $15,000 per post. In December 2019, Disick and girlfriend Sofia Richie were criticized for promoting MDL Beast, a music festival in Saudi Arabia due to the country's human rights violations and treatment of women.

In January 2020, Disick, Kris Jenner, and Khloe Kardashian were featured in several commercials for the video game Coin Master.

Personal life

Disick dated Kourtney Kardashian from 2006 to 2015. They met at a house party in Mexico thrown by Joe Francis. Together they have three children: a son born December 14, 2009, a daughter born July 8, 2012, and a son born December 14, 2014. Their relationship was featured on Keeping Up with the Kardashians and its spinoffs. In 2010, they moved to Miami temporarily with one-year-old Mason and Kourtney's sister Kim. Their relationship went on hold after Kardashian claimed Disick had an alcohol problem. After temporarily giving up alcohol and attending therapy, Disick and Kardashian reconciled in mid-2010.

In 2011, during the season one finale of Kourtney and Kim Take New York, Disick purchased an engagement ring and planned to propose to Kardashian. However, when Disick asked her opinion on marriage, Kardashian responded that she did not want to change things when they were doing well, so Disick decided not to propose. Disick later stated, in 2013, that they were happy and said "I feel like I used to want to get married more than she did, and then, being that she was always so not interested, I've decided not to be." The couple split in 2015, but have shared custody and co-parent their children. Scott remains close with Kardashian's family, and as of 2019 they considered him to be family.

His mother died in 2013, following a long illness. His father died three months later.

Disick has had problems with alcohol and drug use. He was temporarily sober in 2011, during which he claimed, "I'm nicer now that I'm sober." In November 2014, Disick entered a rehabilitation facility in Connecticut following the filming of Kourtney and Khloé Take The Hamptons. In March 2015, he entered a rehabilitation facility in Costa Rica, but checked himself out later that month. After breaking up with Kardashian, Disick entered another rehab facility in Florida. In 2016, he spent time in a rehab facility in Malibu, which he stated helped him to "restart" his life. In May 2020, Disick entered a treatment facility in Edwards, Colorado, after a relapse.

In 2015, Disick sold his Beverly Crest home to Russell Westbrook.

Disick is a car collector, and has owned at least twenty vehicles. He has owned a Rolls-Royce Drophead, a Maybach, several Ferraris, Range Rovers, and Bentleys. Several of his cars and his five-car garage were featured in an Architectural Digest video tour of Disick's home. His collection was also featured on an episode of his short-lived web series, Lord Disick: Lifestyles of a Lord. In addition to cars, Disick also collects watches, including Patek Phillipe and Rolex watches. During a May 2016 burglary, several watches were stolen from Disick's home.

In fall 2017, Disick began dating model Sofia Richie. The couple confirmed their relationship in September 2017. Throughout their relationship, Disick and Richie often vacationed alongside Kardashian and their children.  In 2019, they moved in together in Malibu, California. The couple broke up in August 2020.

In 2018, he was involved in a lawsuit with Silver Airways for failing to pay more than $225,000 in jet fees.

He currently resides in Hidden Hills, California. His home was burglarized in both May 2016 and May 2017, with officials believing the May 2017 burglary was an inside job. Disick was not home during either burglary. Renovations to his home were featured on an episode of Flip It Like Disick, and his home was also featured in Architectural Digest.

From February to September 2021, Disick was in a relationship with model Amelia Hamlin, the daughter of American actress and television personality Lisa Rinna and actor Harry Hamlin.

Filmography

As television actor

As himself on reality TV

As producer

In music videos

References

External links

 
 
 

1983 births
21st-century American businesspeople
American fashion businesspeople
American fashion designers
American investors
20th-century American Jews
American real estate businesspeople
American reality television producers
American socialites
Businesspeople in online retailing
Kardashian family
Keeping Up with the Kardashians
Living people
Male television personalities
Participants in American reality television series
People from Long Island
People from Hidden Hills, California
Television personalities from New York (state)
21st-century American Jews